Howser Peak is a  summit in The Bugaboos of British Columbia, Canada. It is located south of the Bugaboo Glacier and is the southernmost point of Bugaboo Provincial Park. Precipitation runoff from Howser Peak drains north into Bugaboo Creek which is a tributary of the Columbia River; as well as south to Duncan River via Howser Creek.

History
The mountain's toponym was published in "A Climber's Guide to the Interior Ranges of British Columbia" by J.M. Thorington in 1947, and it was officially adopted on October 29, 1962, by the Geographical Names Board of Canada. The peak is named in association with Howser Creek which in turn is named after prospector Fred Hauser who found placer gold there in the late 1800s.

The first ascent of the peak was made on August 28, 1916, by Conrad Kain and Captain Albert H. MacCarthy.

Climate
Based on the Köppen climate classification, Howser Peak is located in a subarctic climate zone with cold, snowy winters, and mild summers. Winter temperatures can drop below −20 °C with wind chill factors below −30 °C. This climate supports the Bugaboo Glacier on the peak's north slope and smaller unnamed glaciers on the east and west slopes.

See also
 The Bugaboos
 Geography of British Columbia

References

External links
 Howser Peak: weather

Columbia Valley
Three-thousanders of British Columbia
Purcell Mountains
Kootenay Land District